Matías Díaz (born 16 March 1993 in Mendoza) is an Argentina rugby union player who plays mostly in the Tight head prop position. He currently plays with the New Zealand team Highlanders in Super Rugby.

He was called up by Rodolfo Ambrosio into the Argentina under-20 side for the 2012 IRB Junior World Championship, and kept his position for the 2013 IRB Junior World Championship.

Díaz made his debut for the senior side in 2013 against eventual runners-up Uruguay in the 2013 South American Rugby Championship "A". Despite only being capped three times (all from the two-tiered competition), Díaz was named in the 30-man squad for the 2013 Rugby Championship.

He was initially named in Argentina's squad for the 2015 Rugby World Cup but then was immediately replaced by Juan Pablo Orlandi after getting injured.

References

Argentine rugby union players
Argentina international rugby union players
Rugby union props
1993 births
Sportspeople from Mendoza, Argentina
Living people
Highlanders (rugby union) players
Expatriate rugby union players in New Zealand
Argentine expatriate rugby union players
Pampas XV players